Tsikoudia (literally "terebinth"), also often called raki in the eastern part of Crete, is an alcoholic beverage, a fragrant, grape-based pomace brandy of Cretan origin that contains 40% to 65% alcohol by volume. Tsikoudia is made by distilling of pomace, what remains of grapes pressed in winemaking. The pomace ferments for about six weeks in a tightly sealed barrel, and is then distilled. 

In the eastern part of Crete tsikoudia is commonly referred to as raki, but apparently less so in the west.

It is often produced at home in villages throughout Crete, thus the alcohol content varies by producer. Typically each Cretan village has one or two residents who are licensed to distill, and tsikoudia is produced continuously for two to three weeks in late October and early November.

Tsikoudia is sometimes served cold from a bottle kept in a freezer. This is commonly offered as an after dinner digestif, and in most tavernas in Crete it is offered as a complimentary digestif with fruits and sweets after the meal.

It can be flavored using lemon rind, rosemary, or honey (rakomelo).

Notes

Pomace brandies
Greek distilled drinks
Greek products with protected designation of origin
Cretan cuisine